Wim is a masculine given name or a shortened form of Willem and other names and may refer to:

 Wim Anderiesen (1903–1944), Dutch footballer
 Wim Aantjes (1923–2015), Dutch politician
 Wim Arras (born 1964), Belgian cyclist
 Wim Blockmans (born 1945), Professor of Medieval History at Leiden University
 Wim Boost (1918–2005), Dutch cartoonist
 Wim Boissevain (born 1927), Australian painter
 Wim Cohen (1923–2000), Dutch mathematician
 Wim Cool (born 1943), Dutch politician
 Wim Crouwel (1928–2019), Dutch graphic designer and typographer
 Wim Crusio (born 1954), Dutch behavioral neurogeneticist
 Wim De Coninck (born 1959), retired Belgian footballer
 Wim De Decker (born 1982), Belgian football player
 Wim De Vocht (born 1982), Belgian professional road bicycle racer
 Wim Deetman (born 1945), Dutch politician and statesman
 Wim Delvoye (born 1965), Belgian conceptual artist
 Wim Duisenberg (1935–2005), Dutch banker and politician
 Wim Ebbinkhuijsen (born 1939), retired Dutch computer scientist
 Wim Eijk (born 1953), Dutch prelate of the Roman Catholic Church
 Wim Eyckmans (born 1973), Belgian race car driver
 Wim Feyaerts (21st century), Belgian television director
 Wim Gijsen (1933–1990), Dutch science fiction and fantasy writer
 Wim Henderickx (born 1962), Flemish classical music composer
 Wim Hermsen (born 1947), former water polo player
 Wim Hesterman (1897–1971), Dutch boxer
 Wim Hof (born 1959), Dutch adventurer and daredevil
 Wim Jansen (1946–2022), former Dutch football player and manager
 Wim Jonk (born 1966), retired Dutch football player
 Wim Kan (1911–1983), Dutch cabaret artist
 Wim Kieft (born 1962), retired Dutch footballer
 Wim Koevermans (born 1960), former football central defender
 Wim Kok (1938–2018), Dutch politician, Prime Minister of the Netherlands from 1994 to 2002
 Wim Kolijn (1944–2015), Dutch politician
 Wim Kortenoeven (born 1955), Dutch politician, author and journalist
 Wim Mertens (born 1953), Flemish Belgian composer, countertenor vocalist, pianist, guitarist, and musicologist
 Wim Meutstege (born 1952), former Dutch football player
 Wim Mook (1932–2016), Dutch isotope physicist
 Wim Rijsbergen (born 1952), football manager
 Wim Ruska (1940–2015), Dutch judoka
 Wim T. Schippers (born 1942), Dutch artist, comedian and voice actor
 "Wim" Schermerhorn (1894–1977), Dutch politician, Prime Minister of the Netherlands from 1945 to 1946
 Wim Schröder (born 1971), Dutch show jumping equestrian
 Wim Schokking (1900–1960), Dutch politician, Minister of Defence of the Netherlands
 Wim Schuhmacher (1894–1986), Dutch painter and designer
 Wim Slijkhuis (1923–2003), Dutch track and field runner
 Wim Sonneveld (1917–1974), Dutch cabaret artist and singer
 Wim Soutaer (born 1974), Belgian singer
 Wim Stroetinga (born 1985), Dutch professional racing cyclist
 Wim Suurbier (1945–2020), Dutch football player
 Wim Taymans (born 1972), software developer
 Wim Thoelke (1927–1995), German TV host 
 Wim Thomassen (1909–2001), Dutch politician
 Wim Turkenburg (born 1947), Dutch academic
 Wim Udenhout (born 1937), Prime Minister of Suriname in the mid-1980s
 Wim van de Schilde (born 1948), former water polo player
 Wim van den Goorbergh (born 1948), Dutch economist and banker
 Wim van der Kroft (1916–2001), Dutch canoer
 Wim van der Veen, Dutch ten-pin bowler
 Wim van der Voort (1923–2016), Dutch speed skater
 Wim van Eekelen (born 1931), Dutch politician, former Minister of Defence of the Netherlands
 Wim van Es (born 1934), Dutch archaeologist
 Wim van Est (1923–2003), Dutch cyclist
 Wim Van Grembergen (born 1947), Belgian organizational theorist and professor
 Wim van Heel (1922–1972), Dutch field hockey player
 Wim van Heumen (1928–1992), field hockey coach
 Wim Van Huffel (born 1979), Belgian professional road bicycle racer
 Wim van Hulst (1939–2018), Dutch economist and professor
 Wim van Norden (1917–2015), Dutch journalist
 Wim van Spingelen (born 1938), former water polo player
 Wim van Til (born 1953), retired Dutch footballer
 Wim Vansevenant (born 1971), Belgian professional road bicycle racer
 Wim Vriend (born 1941), former water polo player
 Wim Wenders (born 1945), German film director, playwright, photographer and producer
 Wim Zaal (born 1935), Dutch journalist, essayist, translator and literary critic

See also
 Javon Wims (born 1994), American football player
 Whim (disambiguation)

Dutch masculine given names
Masculine given names